Mutya is a Philippine TV series.

Mutya can also refer to:

 Mutya Orquia, a Filipina child actresses
 Mutya Buena, an English singer
 Mutya Johanna Datul, a Filipina beauty queen

See also